The 2020 Webby Awards ceremony was posted online on May 19, 2020, and was hosted by Patton Oswalt. Named Webbys From Home, it recognized the best of Internet content. Due to the COVID-19 pandemic, the award ceremony was held virtually at the organization's official website with pre-recorded material at remote locations. The ceremony included guest appearances from Michelle Obama, Kristen Bell, Tom Hanks, Demi Lovato, Anthony Fauci, Jill Scott and Questlove, among others. The awards were dedicated "to honoring individuals and organizations who are using the internet in response to the coronavirus pandemic."

Google and National Geographic won the most awards at 14 each.

Winners

References

External links
Official site
2020 Winners

2020
2020 awards in the United States
2020 in Los Angeles
May 2020 events in the United States
2020 in Internet culture